Nevryuyevo is a rural locality (a village) in Vyatkinskoye Rural Settlement, Sudogodsky District, Vladimir Oblast, Russia. The population was 15 as of 2010.

Geography 
Nevryuyevo is located 45 km northwest of Sudogda (the district's administrative centre) by road. Nizhnyaya Zaninka is the nearest rural locality.

References 

Rural localities in Sudogodsky District